Lloyd Jones (born 1 August 1988) is a Welsh-French former competitive ice dancer. He represented France from 2009 to 2014. With Pernelle Carron, he is the 2011 Cup of China bronze medalist, 2013 Winter Universiade champion, 2010 Cup of Nice champion, three-time NRW Trophy champion, and 2010 French national champion. The two competed at the 2014 Winter Olympics in Sochi. Earlier in his career, Jones competed for Great Britain.

Personal life 
Jones was born on 1 August 1988 in Cardiff, Wales. He became a French citizen in October 2013.

Career

Early partnerships 
Early in his career, Jones competed for Great Britain. Following a partnership with Lucy Strange, he teamed up with Leigh Rogers. They won two British national junior titles and competed twice at the World Junior Championships. His next partner was Danielle Bennett, with whom he won silver on the junior level at the 2009 British Championships.

Partnership with Pernelle Carron 
In April 2009, Jones teamed up with Pernelle Carron to compete for France. They were coached by Muriel Boucher-Zazoui and Romain Haguenauer in Lyon, France, at the start of their partnership.

In their first season together, Carron and Jones won the NRW Trophy and became the French national champions, a title they won in the absence of the higher ranked Isabelle Delobel / Olivier Schoenfelder and Nathalie Pechalat / Fabian Bourzat. Carron and Jones were 12th at the European Championships and at that season's World Championships.

In the 2010–2011 season, they again won the 2010 NRW Trophy, as well as the 2010 Coupe de Nice, and finished 5th and 4th in two Grand Prix assignments, 2011 Skate Canada and the 2010 Trophee Eric Bompard, respectively. They were unable to defend their national title, finishing with a silver medal behind Pechalat and Bourzat. They moved up to 9th at the European Championships and again finished 12th at Worlds. After the season ended, they moved to the United States to be coached by Natalia Linichuk.

In 2011–12, Carron and Jones began their season by taking silver at the 2011 Cup of Nice. They then won their first Grand Prix medal together, bronze, at the 2011 Cup of China. At the end of the season, they moved to the UK to be coached by Marika Humphreys.

Programs

With Carron

With Rogers

Competitive highlights 

GP: Grand Prix; JGP: Junior Grand Prix

With Carron for France

With Bennett for Great Britain

With Rogers for Great Britain

References

External links 

 
 

British male ice dancers
French male ice dancers
1988 births
Living people
Sportspeople from Cardiff
Figure skaters at the 2014 Winter Olympics
Olympic figure skaters of France
Naturalized citizens of France
Welsh ice dancers
Universiade medalists in figure skating
Universiade gold medalists for Russia
Competitors at the 2013 Winter Universiade